Highway 60 is a provincial highway in the Canadian province of Saskatchewan. It runs from Highway 7 near Saskatoon to Pike Lake Provincial Park. This route primarily serves as a link connecting Saskatonians to Pike Lake and its campground, though it is also an important local road for acreages and businesses in the area. The speed limit is 90 km/h (55 mph). The Saskatchewan Railway Museum is located at the Hawker Siding about 3 km from Highway 7. Hawker Siding was previously known as Eaton Siding. A Ukrainian church is farther south on the highway.

Photo gallery

Major intersections
From north to south:

References 

060